Not Quite Art is an Australian TV series that documents the many media of present-day art and culture in Australia. Two series of the series have been produced and aired on ABC1, both with 3 episodes each, the second series also aired on ABC2. The series is created and hosted by Marcus Westbury.

Episodes
Two series of Not Quite Art have been produced. Series 1 aired in October 2007 and featured 3 episodes, these were aired on Tuesdays at 10pm. A second series was subsequently produced and aired in October 2008, also featuring 3 episodes, these were also aired on Tuesdays at 10pm.

Series 1 (2007)

Series 2 (2008)

Critical response
Not Quite Art has been accepted to favourable reviews and critical acclaim. An article in The Age Newspaper explained; "Not Quite Art is the freshest, most illuminating, thoughtful and funny locally made arts program in years."

References

External resources
The Age, Green Guide, Article, October 2008.
Official Website

Australian Broadcasting Corporation original programming